Parliamentary elections were held in Mauritania on 6 March 1992, with a second round on 13 March. They were the first National Assembly elections after the constitutional referendum the previous year that resulted in the reintroduction of multi-party democracy. The result was a victory for the ruling Democratic and Social Republican Party, which won 67 of the 79 seats in the Assembly. Voter turnout was just 38.9%.

Results

References

Mauritania
1992 in Mauritania
Elections in Mauritania
March 1992 events in Africa